The Canton of Saint-Claude is a former canton in the Arrondissement of Basse-Terre on the island of Guadeloupe. It was disbanded following the French canton reorganisation which came into effect in March 2015. It had 10,439 inhabitants (2012). It comprised the commune of Saint-Claude, which joined the new canton of Basse-Terre in 2015.

See also
Cantons of Guadeloupe
Communes of Guadeloupe
Arrondissements of Guadeloupe

References

Former cantons of Guadeloupe
2015 disestablishments in France
States and territories disestablished in 2015